Newhaven railway station served the area of Newhaven, Edinburgh, Scotland, from 1879 to 1962 on the Leith North Passenger Branch.

History 
The station was opened on 1 August 1879 by the Caledonian Railway. The station building and its offices were on Craighall Road. There were two goods yards: Newhaven Goods and Minerals and Leith High Depot. Two additional platforms were built in 1902 to serve the Leith New Lines. The station closed on 30 April 1962.

References 

Disused railway stations in Edinburgh
Former Caledonian Railway stations
Railway stations in Great Britain opened in 1879
Railway stations in Great Britain closed in 1962
1879 establishments in Scotland
1962 disestablishments in Scotland